Trevor Franklin may refer to:

 Trevor Franklin (cricketer) (born 1962), New Zealand cricketer
 Trevor Franklin (soccer) (born 1957), retired English-American soccer defender